Stumpffia tetradactyla is a species of frog in the family Microhylidae.
It is endemic to Madagascar.
Its natural habitats are subtropical or tropical moist lowland forests and heavily degraded former forest.
It is threatened by habitat loss..

References

 

Stumpffia
Amphibians described in 1991
Endemic frogs of Madagascar
Taxonomy articles created by Polbot